The Antonine Wall, known to the Romans as Vallum Antonini, was a turf fortification on stone foundations, built by the Romans across what is now the Central Belt of Scotland, between the Firth of Clyde and the Firth of Forth. Built some twenty years after Hadrian's Wall to the south, and intended to supersede it, while it was garrisoned it was the northernmost frontier barrier of the Roman Empire. Lidar scans have been carried out to establish the length of the wall and the Roman distance units used. Security was bolstered by a deep ditch on the northern side. It is thought that there was a wooden palisade on top of the turf. The barrier was the second of two "great walls" created by the Romans in Great Britain in the second century AD. Its ruins are less evident than those of the better-known and longer Hadrian's Wall to the south, primarily because the turf and wood wall has largely weathered away, unlike its stone-built southern predecessor.

Construction began in 142 AD at the order of Roman Emperor Antoninus Pius, and took about 12 years to complete. Antoninus Pius never visited Britain, unlike his predecessor Hadrian. Pressure from the Caledonians may have led Antoninus to send the empire's troops farther north. The Antonine Wall was protected by 16 forts with small fortlets between them; troop movement was facilitated by a road linking all the sites known as the Military Way. The soldiers who built the wall commemorated the construction and their struggles with the Caledonians with decorative slabs, twenty of which survive. The wall was abandoned only eight years after completion, and the garrisons relocated rearward to Hadrian's Wall. Most of the wall and its associated fortifications have been destroyed over time, but some remains are visible. Many of these have come under the care of Historic Environment Scotland and the UNESCO World Heritage Committee.

Location and construction 

Roman Emperor Antoninus Pius ordered the construction of the Antonine Wall around 142 CE. Quintus Lollius Urbicus, governor of Roman Britain at the time, initially supervised the effort, which took about twelve years to complete. The wall stretches  from Old Kilpatrick in West Dunbartonshire on the Firth of Clyde to Carriden near Bo'ness on the Firth of Forth. The wall was intended to extend Roman territory and dominance by replacing Hadrian's Wall  to the south, as the frontier of Britannia. But while the Romans did establish forts and temporary camps farther north of the Antonine Wall in order to protect their routes to the north of Scotland, they did not conquer the Caledonians, and the Antonine Wall suffered many attacks. The Romans called the land north of the wall Caledonia, though in some contexts the term may refer to the whole area north of Hadrian's Wall. The land north of the Antonine Wall also ended up becoming the part of Scotland known as Albany.

The Antonine Wall was shorter than Hadrian's Wall and built of turf on a stone foundation, but it was still an impressive achievement. It was also a simpler fortification than Hadrian's Wall insofar as it did not have a subsidiary ditch system behind it to the south, as Hadrian's Wall did with its Vallum. The stone foundations and wing walls of the original forts on the Antonine Wall demonstrate that the original plan was to build a stone wall similar to Hadrian's Wall, but this was quickly amended. The Romans initially planned to build forts every , but this was soon revised to every , resulting in a total of nineteen forts along the wall. The best preserved but also one of the smallest forts is Rough Castle Fort. In addition to the forts, there are at least 9 smaller fortlets, very likely on Roman mile spacings, which formed part of the original scheme, some of which were later replaced by forts. The most visible fortlet is Kinneil, at the eastern end of the Wall, near Bo'ness.

There was once a remarkable Roman structure within sight of the Antonine Wall at Stenhousemuir, which took its name from the Roman "stone house". This was Arthur's O'on, a circular stone domed monument or rotunda, which may have been a temple, or a tropaeum, a victory monument. It was demolished for its stone in 1743, though a replica exists at Penicuik House.

In addition to the line of the Wall itself there are a number of coastal forts both in the East (e.g. Inveresk) and West (Outerwards and Lurg Moor), which should be considered as outposts and/or supply bases to the Wall itself. In addition a number of forts farther north were brought back into service in the Gask Ridge area, including Ardoch, Strageath, Bertha (Perth) and probably Dalginross and Cargill.

Recent research by Glasgow University has shown that the distance stones, stone sculptures unique to the Antonine Wall which were embedded in the wall to mark the lengths built by each legion, were brightly painted unlike their present bare appearance. These stones are preserved in the university's museum and are said to be the best-preserved examples of statuary from any Roman frontier. Several of the slabs have been analysed by various techniques including portable X-ray fluorescence (pXRF). Tiny remnants of paint have been detected by surface-enhanced Raman spectroscopy (SERS). Several of the distance slabs have been scanned and 3-D videos produced. There are plans to reproduce the slabs, both digitally and in real physical copies, with their authentic colours. A copy of the Bridgeness Slab has already been made and can be found in Bo'ness. It is also expected that lottery funding will allow replicas of distance markers to be placed along the length of the wall.

Abandonment 
The wall was abandoned only eight years after completion, when the Roman legions withdrew to Hadrian's Wall in 162 CE, and over time may have reached an accommodation with the Brythonic tribes of the area, whom they may have fostered as possible buffer states which would later become "The Old North". After a series of attacks in 197, the emperor Septimius Severus arrived in Scotland in 208, and campaigned against the Maeatae (based in the central Midland Valley on either side of the Firth of Clyde – Firth of Forth line) and the Caledonians to their north. While he carried out substantial work on Hadrian's Wall at the time, there is no evidence of any attention being paid to the remains of the Antonine Wall during the campaigns of 208–210. References in Late Roman sources to Severus' wall-building activities led to later scholars like Bede mistaking references to the Antonine Wall for ones to Hadrian's Wall.

Post-Roman history 
In the centuries since the Antonine Wall lay abandoned, it had an influence over culture between the Forth and the Clyde.

Gildas and Bede 
Writing in 730 AD, Bede, following Gildas in his De Excidio et Conquestu Britanniae, mistakenly ascribes the construction of the Antonine Wall to the Britons in his Historia Ecclesiastica 1.12:

Bede associated Gildas's turf wall with the Antonine Wall. As for Hadrian's Wall, Bede again follows Gildas:

Bede obviously identified Gildas's stone wall as Hadrian's Wall, but he sets its construction in the 5th century rather than the 120s, and does not mention Hadrian. And he would appear to have believed that the ditch-and-mound barrier known as the Vallum (just to the south of, and contemporary with, Hadrian's Wall) was the rampart constructed by Severus. Many centuries would pass before just who built what became apparent.

Grim's Dyke 
In medieval histories, such as the chronicles of John of Fordun, the wall is called Gryme's dyke. Fordun says that the name came from the grandfather of the imaginary king Eugenius son of Farquahar. This evolved over time into Graham's dyke – a name still found in Bo'ness at the wall's eastern end – and then linked with Clan Graham. Of note is that Graeme in some parts of Scotland is a nickname for the devil, and Gryme's Dyke would thus be the Devil's Dyke, mirroring the name of the Roman limes in Southern Germany often called 'Teufelsmauer'. Grímr and Grim are bynames for Odin or Wodan, who might be credited with the wish to build earthworks in unreasonably short periods of time. This name is the same one found as Grim's Ditch several times in England in connection with early ramparts: for example, near Wallingford, Oxfordshire or between Berkhamsted (Herts) and Bradenham (Bucks). Other names used by antiquarians include the Wall of Pius and the Antonine Vallum, after Antoninus Pius. Hector Boece in his 1527 History of Scotland called it the "wall of Abercorn", repeating the story that it had been destroyed by Graham.

Scottish renaissance 
Renaissance patrons in the 16th century, including George Keith, 5th Earl Marischal, who were exposed to the world of international scholarship through diplomacy, began to collect antiquities. The Earl Marischal set a stone from the Antonine Wall in the walls of Dunnotar Castle and had it painted and gilded, probably by Andrew Melville of Stonehaven. The stone is now at the Hunterian Museum in Glasgow and residual paint traces likely remaining from its later reuse have been analysed.

World Heritage status 

The UK government's nomination of the Antonine Wall for World Heritage status to the international conservation body UNESCO was first officially announced in 2003. It has been backed by the Scottish Government since 2005 and by Scotland's then Culture Minister Patricia Ferguson since 2006. It became the UK's official nomination in late January 2007, and MSPs were called to support the bid anew in May 2007. The Antonine Wall was listed as an extension to the World Heritage Site "Frontiers of the Roman Empire" on 7 July 2008. Though the Antonine Wall is mentioned in the text, it does not appear on UNESCO's map of world heritage properties.

Historic Environment Scotland 
Several individual sites along the line of the wall are in the care of Historic Scotland. These are at:

 Bar Hill Fort
 Bearsden Bath House
 Castlecary
 Croy Hill
 Dullatur
 Rough Castle
 Seabegs Wood
 Watling Lodge
 Westerwood, Cumbernauld

All sites are unmanned and open at all reasonable times.

Mapping the wall 
The first capable effort to systematically map the Antonine Wall was undertaken in 1764 by William Roy, the forerunner of the Ordnance Survey. He provided accurate and detailed drawings of its remains, and where the wall has been destroyed by later development, his maps and drawings are now the only reliable record of it. In the 19th century, the Ordnance Survey showed the visible traces of the wall in some detail on its first and second edition maps at 25-inch and 6-inch scales, but no attempt was made at that date to undertake archaeological work.

Sir George Macdonald carried out systematic work on the wall that was published in 1911 and in an expanded second edition in 1934. His work provided the basis for a large-scale (25-inch) folio produced by the Ordnance Survey in 1931. The Ordnance Survey produced a revised folio in 1954–1957, and then carried out a complete re-survey in 1979–80. They also published a smaller scale map of the Wall, at 1:25,000 in 1969. Further mapping activity was carried out to support the nomination of the Wall as a World Heritage Site

Modern computer techniques like using GIS and LIDAR can now map the wall in 3-dimensions which makes it much easier to study for example how visible forts and fortlets were to their fellow soldiers along the wall.

In fiction 

The Northern Wall is also depicted in some of Rosemary Sutcliff's historical fiction novels: as a fully functioning outpost of Roman power in The Mark of the Horse Lord (1965) and as an abandoned ruin in Frontier Wolf (1980).

See also 
 Banknotes of Scotland (featured on design)
 Gask Ridge
 National Museums of Scotland
 Scotland during the Roman Empire
 The Bridgeness Slab
 Trimontium (Newstead)
 World Heritage Sites in Scotland

References 

 
142 establishments
140s establishments in the Roman Empire
Buildings and structures completed in the 2nd century
2nd-century fortifications
2nd-century establishments in Roman Britain
Archaeological sites in East Dunbartonshire
Archaeological sites in North Lanarkshire
Archaeological sites in Falkirk (council area)
Roman frontiers
World Heritage Sites in Scotland
Antoninus Pius
Scheduled monuments in Scotland
Roman walls in Scotland
Linear earthworks